This article details the Catalans Dragons rugby league football club's 2011 season. This is their 6th season in the Super League.

Table

Milestones

Round 1: Damien Blanch, Ben Farrar, Scott Dureau, Lopini Paea, Ian Henderson and Steve Menzies made their debuts for the Dragons.
Round 1: Damien Blanch scored his 1st try for the Dragons.
Round 2: Éloi Pélissier made his debut for the Dragons.
Round 2: Scott Dureau kicked his 1st goal for the Dragons.
Round 3: David Ferriol made his 100th appearance for the Dragons.
Round 3: Daryl Millard and Jason Baitieri made their debuts for the Dragons.
Round 3: Steve Menzies scored his 1st try for the Dragons.
Round 3: Scott Dureau kicked his 1st drop goal for the Dragons.
Round 4: Scott Dureau scored his 1st try for the Dragons.
Round 6: Clint Greenshields scored his 2nd hat-trick for the Dragons.
Round 6: Ben Farrar scored his 1st try for the Dragons.
Round 8: Daryl Millard scored his 1st try for the Dragons.
Round 9: Cyril Stacul made his 50th appearance for the Dragons.
Round 10: Ian Henderson scored his 1st try for the Dragons.
Round 11: Jean-Philippe Baile made his 50th appearance for the Dragons.
Round 11: Jason Baitieri scored his 1st try for the Dragons.
Round 11: Éloi Pélissier scored his 1st try for the Dragons.
Round 11: Scott Dureau reached 100 points for the Dragons.
Round 12: Mathias Pala made his debut for the Dragons.
Round 13: Jamal Fakir made his 100th appearance for the Dragons.
Round 15: Grégory Mounis made his 150th appearance for the Dragons.
Round 15: Sébastien Raguin made his 100th appearance for the Dragons.
Round 21: Thibaut Ancely made his debut for the Dragons.
Round 21: Sébastien Raguin scored his 25th try and reached 100 points for the Dragons.
Round 22: Rémy Marginet made his debut for the Dragons.
Round 22: Rémy Marginet kicked his 1st goal for the Dragons.
Round 23: Vincent Duport made his 50th appearance for the Dragons.
Round 23: Mickaël Simon scored his 1st try for the Dragons.
Round 25: Scott Dureau reached 200 points for the Dragons.
EPO: Damien Blanch scored his 1st hat-trick for the Dragons.

Fixtures and results

2011 Super League

Super League Play-offs

Player appearances
Super League only

 = Injured

 = Suspended

Challenge Cup

Player appearances
Challenge Cup games only

 = Injured

 = Suspended

Squad statistics

 Appearances and Points include (Super League, Challenge Cup and play-offs) as of 25 September 2011.

Transfers

In

Out

References

2011 in rugby league by club
2011 in English rugby league
Catalans Dragons seasons